Charlie Altekruse (born August 28, 1958) is an American rower. He competed in the men's quadruple sculls event at the 1988 Summer Olympics.  He graduated from Harvard University.

References

External links
 

1958 births
Living people
American male rowers
Olympic rowers of the United States
Rowers at the 1988 Summer Olympics
Place of birth missing (living people)
Harvard Crimson rowers